Fencing (Spanish: Esgrima), for the 2013 Bolivarian Games, took place from 18 November to 23 November 2013.

Medal table
Key:

Medalists

References

Events at the 2013 Bolivarian Games
2013 in fencing
2013 Bolivarian Games
Fencing competitions in Peru